The year 1647 in music involved some significant events.

Events 
Soprano Anne Chabanceau de La Barre makes her operatic debut.

Publications 
Constantin Huygens – Pathodia sacra et profana, a collection of psalms and songs, published in Paris
Carlo Milanuzzi –  for one, two, three, and four voices, Op. 23 (Venice: Alessandro Vincenti)

Classical music

Opera 
 Luigi Rossi – Orfeo, premiered in Rome

Births 
December 4 – Daniel Eberlin, composer and Kapellmeister (died c. 1715)
date unknown – Pelham Humfrey, English composer and singer (died 1674)

Deaths 
February 17 – Johann Heermann, hymn-writer (b. 1585)
March 15 (bur.) – John Milton, amateur composer (b. 1562)
December 31 – Giovanni Maria Trabaci, organist and composer (b. c. 1575)
date unknown
Giovanni Battista Doni, musicologist (b. c. 1593)
Mateo Romero, composer (born 1575)